Darsait is a residential locality in Muscat, the capital of the Sultanate of Oman. It is known for its wide array of residences ranging from small studio apartments to single-family villas. Darsait has a population around 150 to 200 thousand. It is also one of the more prominent localities of Muscat. This is where a majority of the Indian population that has migrated to Muscat over the years stay. Therefore it is also known as Little India of Muscat.

Schools
 Indian School, Muscat
 Indian School, Darsait
 Pakistan School Muscat

Places of worship
 Sts. Peter & Paul Church, Ruwi
 Darsait Krishna Temple
 Noor Mosque

Government offices
 Baladiya Muscat (municipal office)

Shopping
Lulu Hypermarket
Muscat Bakery Markets
Abu Ammar Mart
Noor Shopping Centre

Hospitals
KIMS

Indian restaurants
Ganga Restaurant (inside Muscat Bakery Market), The Food Stories Restaurant, Ananthapuri (Kerala Cuisine), Al Afeel Restaurant, Lulu food counter

References

Populated places in the Muscat Governorate
Suburbs of Muscat, Oman